Siedlnica  (German: Zedlitz) is a village in the administrative district of Gmina Wschowa, within Wschowa County, Lubusz Voivodeship, in western Poland.

The village has a population of 882. 

The village has several attractions for tourists (mainly from Germany), such as the church the name of the Birth of Saint Mary and John the Baptist, two castles - one from the 17th century, the other from the 18th century.

References

Siedlnica